Frank Miloye Milenkovich State Airport  is the airport serving Marília, Brazil.

It is operated by Rede Voa.

History
The airport was opened in 1938.

It was at this airport that on January 7, 1961 TAM – Táxi Aéreo Marília, the forerunner of TAM Airlines (rebranded LATAM Brasil) started its operations as a company specialized in general aviation.

On July 15, 2021, the concession of the airport was auctioned to Rede Voa, under the name Consórcio Voa NW e Voa SE. The airport was previously operated by DAESP.

Airlines and destinations

Access

See also

List of airports in Brazil

References

External links

Airports in São Paulo (state)
Airports established in 1938
Marília